Adam Zotovich is a Broadway performer and producer.  He is best known for being among the producers of The Color Purple's theatrical adaptation. As of 2014, Zotovich has produced eight shows that have spawned tours, a London engagement and have grossed a total of more than $245 million. As a performer, he has also been credited as an understudy, swing or replacement in shows such as The Wedding Singer, Contact, and revivals of Fiddler on the Roof and  Chicago.

Producing Credits
 Of Mice and Men - 2014
 Evita - 2012-2013
 Driving Miss Daisy - 2010-2011
 The Addams Family - 2010–2011
 A View From the Bridge - 2010
 All My Sons - 2008-2009
 Legally Blonde 2007-2008
 The Color Purple - 2005-2008

References

External links

 

Living people
Santa Clara University alumni
American theatre managers and producers
Year of birth missing (living people)